Nymphas meaning "nymph" is a person mentioned in the New Testament, either a woman or a man, depending on accenting of the Greek text, in the New Testament saluted by Paul of Tarsus in his Epistle to the Colossians as a member of the church of Laodicea. It is possibly a contraction of Nymphodorus (if one ascribes to the masculine minority reading). The church met in her (or his) house.  According to Ben Witherington III, the masculinization of Nymphas's name is one of a series of anti-feminist redactions in the Western text-type manuscripts.

See also 
 Colossians 4

References

People in the Pauline epistles